Norman Augustus Black (born November 12, 1957) is an American former professional basketball player who played in the CBA, NBA, and PBA. He's the current head coach for the Meralco Bolts.

He has since settled in the Philippines. He is also a former head coach of the San Miguel Beermen, Mobiline Phone Pals, Pop Cola 800s, Sta. Lucia Realtors and Talk 'N Text Tropang Texters. He has also coached the Ateneo Blue Eagles in the UAAP. During his playing career, his moniker was Mr. 100%.

Career

High school, college, NBA and CBA career
Black played high school basketball for the Cardinal Gibbons School in Baltimore where he graduated in 1975.   He then played for Saint Joseph's College in Pennsylvania from 1975 to 1979, averaging 17 points per game in his playing career. Black later played in Continental Basketball Association from 1979 to 1982 for the Lancaster Red Roses and the Philadelphia Kings. He also played for the Detroit Pistons in the National Basketball Association, but played only three games in the 1980–81 season, averaging 2.7 points per game.

PBA career
In 1981, Black was playing in the Detroit Pistons' summer basketball league when he was offered a job on the other side of the world. "Jimmy Mariano, who was coach of Great Taste at the time, asked me if I wanted to come over and play in the Philippines," he said. The lure of guaranteed money, something the Pistons could not offer then, helped change his life in a way he could never have imagined. However, by the time he returned Mariano's call, Big Lew Massey had taken the job. But it did not take long before another Philippine Basketball Association club came calling. Tefilin's General Manager Frank Harn offered the same contract as Mariano and he immediately took the offer.

In 1981, he made his PBA debut for Tefilin. In 14 games, he averaged an outstanding 51 point per game, but failed to lead his team to a championship. He returned to the Philippines in 1982, playing 66 games for San Miguel Beer and averaged close to 43 points per contest. With him, locals Yoyong Martirez, Manny Paner, Marte Saldaña, and head coach Tommy Manotoc, San Miguel won the 1982 Invitational tournament against guest South Korea. In 1983, he played for Great Taste Coffee and averaged 38 points in 49 games played. Always considered an intelligent as well as a hard-working player, he became the recipient of the very first "Mr. 100% Award" in that season.  Sportscaster Pinggoy Pengson dubbed him "That Old Black Magic" after a song from the 1950s.

Two years later, he returned to play for Magnolia Quench Plus, norming 43.5 points per game, while scoring his career best 76 points. After Magnolia (later San Miguel Beer), left the league for a while, he played for rookie squad Alaska, after former Magnolia players were put in the new franchise. After a short while, he returned to San Miguel as their playing coach in some import-laden conferences while acting as a full-time coach in the All-Filipino Conferences. In 1989, he played and coached the Beermen to a rare Grand Slam, the third in PBA history. In 1990, he played his last complete season as a player before finally focusing his duties as head coach in 1991.

Coaching career

San Miguel 
"It was former ambassador Danding Cojuangco who asked me to become a head coach in 1985," Black relates, "I had no desire to be a coach back then." He went on to say that the former ambassador probably heard something in Black's voice while he was doing some analysis for the TV broadcast of the PBA that made Cojuangco believe he would be suited for coaching.

His coaching career started around 1985 and 1986, as a playing coach. But by 1987, he became San Miguel's full-time coach until 1996, when he left the Beermen. He won nine championships as head coach of San Miguel including a Grandslam in 1989 making San Miguel the winningest team in the PBA, coaching some of the best players in PBA history such as superstars Samboy Lim, Allan Caidic, Hector Calma, Ramon Fernandez, Ricky Brown, Ato Agustin and role players Alvin Teng, Yves Dignadice, Art dela Cruz, Franz Pumaren, Elmer Reyes, Jeffrey Graves, Pido Jarencio, Bobby Jose, Romy Lopez, Josel Angeles, Ricky Cui, Kevin Ramas, Bong Ravena, and Dong Polistico. In 1994, he was named head coach of the Philippine Team in the Hiroshima Asian Games, after the Beermen won the All-Filipino Cup. However, the country went home without a medal in basketball, after placing fourth. In 1996, with San Miguel needing an import, he played as a temporary import for the Beermen and scored 15 points.

Mobiline, Sta. Lucia 
After almost a decade with San Miguel, he became the head coach of the young Mobiline Phone Pals in 1997. But after the Commissioner's Cup, he became the coach of the struggling Pop Cola squad. He led the 800's to two third-place finishes with Vergel Meneses, Bonel Balingit, and Kenneth Duremdes on the team. he also suited up for Pop Cola, probably his last PBA game, in a third place game against Shell. He scored 10 points, including a three-pointer, that gave the 800s its second consecutive third-place run. In 1999, Pop Cola struggled all through, including a terrible 0–8 finish in the Governor's Cup. he left Pop Cola after the season before being hired as Sta. Lucia Realtors head coach.

In 2000, he led Sta. Lucia to its first finals appearance, losing to San Miguel in five games of the Commissioner's Cup. However, a year later, he coached the Realtors to its first championship, defeating the Beermen in the season ending Governor's Cup. After the 2002 season, he resigned as head coach of the Realtors with longtime assistant, and friend Alfrancis Chua elevated as the new coach of the team.

TV commentator
During his coaching days, Black was even hired by PBA TV broadcasters as a guest analyst of selected games. After leaving Sta. Lucia in 2003, he was hired by new TV network National Broadcasting Network as their analyst for PBA games. He normally was paired with Mico Halili and did quite well as a commentator, often mixing a Tagalog word to his English analysis.

After NBN was dropped as TV broadcaster, he was absorbed by new TV network Associated Broadcasting Company. He normally pairs with Mico Halili, Ed Picson, and Paolo Trillo. During the 2005–2006 and the 2006–2007 season, he was seen every Sunday on the halftime segment "Black's Board" where he dished out the week's highlights around the league and Philippine basketball as well.

He also did several shoots about basketball basics in a segment called Burlington Basketball 101 for ABC's pregame show known as PBA Gamebol. Outside of commentary, he is known as an endorser for Burlington, a known sock product.

Ateneo Blue Eagles head coach
In 2004, Black was hired by the Ateneo Blue Eagles as its team consultant. But after a disappointing 2004 season, in which the Blue Eagles finished third under Sandy Arespacochaga, school officials hired him as the Blue Eagles' new head coach for the 2005 campaign, the 35th coach in its history.

He led the Blue Eagles to a 10–4 win–loss record in his first season, but they were eliminated by the De La Salle Green Archers, who had a twice to beat advantage against them.

In the 69th season, he led the Blue Eagles to a 10–2 win–loss slate, the best record in the elimination round. After defeating the Adamson Falcons in the Final Four, Ateneo battled the UST Growling Tigers in a grueling three-game series. Black designed a play in their Game 1 victory. The play was a long inbound pass by Macky Escalona who found a wide-open Kramer underneath the basket for the victory. However, despite the historic Game 1 victory, they were unable to win the championship. They lost to the Tigers in Game 2 by a large margin, and then in Game 3 in overtime.

In 2007, during the UAAP's 70th season, in spite of a lack of talent, he led the Eagles to a 9–5 standing. However, the Blue Eagles still lost in crucial games; they were unable to secure the No. 2 Seed due to their loss to the NU Bulldogs, and lost to the returning De La Salle Green Archers in a battle for the No. 2 seed, which would have given them a twice to beat advantage had they won. Instead, they settled for the No. 3 seed, and were able to eliminate the defending champions UST Growling Tigers. The Blue Eagles then forced a do-or-die game against La Salle in the semifinals but lost.

Later that year, he coached the Blue Eagles to winning the 2007 Collegiate Champions League national basketball title, where they defeated the University of the Visayas Green Lancers.

In 2008, which was season 71 of the UAAP, he led the Blue Eagles to a 13–1 elimination round record, and won the championship over the defending champions La Salle by sweeping the series with Ateneo winning, 69–61 in Game 1, and, 62–51 in Game 2. This was Ateneo's first UAAP title since winning it in 2002 . Months later, he coached the Blue Eagles to another championship in the annual Philippine University Games, defeating the EAC Generals.
 
In 2009, he coached the Blue Eagles to three titles. In UAAP Season 72, the Blue Eagles won their second straight UAAP Men's Basketball Championship, won against the UE Red Warriors, and again with a 13–1 win loss record. This was followed by back-to-back titles in the University Games, this time won against St. Francis of Assisi College. The third title was the Blue Eagles' second national championship under his tutelage in the 2009 Philippine Collegiate Championship, the successor to the Collegiate Champions League, where they defeated the FEU Tamaraws

In 2010, he won his first three-peat as a coach for Ateneo Blue Eagles for UAAP Season 73, duplicating the Grand Slam feat when he was a coach for San Miguel Beermen in 1989. he led the Blue Eagles to a 10–4 win–loss record in the eliminations (good for solo 2nd place and the last twice-to-beat advantage), a victory over the Adamson Falcons in the semifinals, and a sweep of the FEU Tamaraws in the finals, with a 72–49 blowout victory in Game 1 and a 65–62 title-clinching victory in Game 2 (in which the Eagles were threatened throughout the game). Later that year, he coached the Blue Eagles to winning the 2010 Philippine Collegiate Championship title, this time against the Adamson Falcons, earning his team their third national championship under his tutelage.

In 2011, he once again steered the Ateneo Blue Eagles to a rare Four-peat as head coach for UAAP Season 74, joining the UST Growling Tigers and the De La Salle Green Archers as the only schools to win four basketball titles in a row since the Final Four started in 1994.  Under his tutelage, the Blue Eagles finished the eliminations with a 13–1 win–loss record.  They faced the UST Growling Tigers in the Final Four, with Ateneo winning, 69–66.  Later on in the Finals, it was a rematch against their previous year's opponent, the FEU Tamaraws.  Once again, his Ateneo Blue Eagles swept the series, with Ateneo winning, 82–64 in Game 1, and, 82–69 in Game 2.

In 2012, months before the opening of the 75th season of the UAAP he announced that he would be leaving the Ateneo Blue Eagles right after UAAP Season 75 to go to the pros and to takeover the coaching duties of the Talk 'N Text Tropang Texters from Coach Chot Reyes, who would be leaving the team to coach the Smart Gilas II. At the end of the UAAP season, the Blue Eagles won another championship, their fifth in a row this time in a rematch against their 2006 Finals opponent the UST Growling Tigers by sweeping the series with a score of 83–78 in Game 1, and 65–62 in Game 2. With this achievement, he became only the second coach in the history of the UAAP to win five straight UAAP championship after Baby Dalupan who have won seven straight championships (Season 28–34) with the UE Red Warriors.

Back to coaching in the PBA

Talk 'N Text Tropang Texters (2012–2014)

After winning five straight titles for Ateneo, Black returned to coaching in the PBA, with the star-studded Talk 'N Text Tropang Texters. While coaching the Texters, he became the latest member of the 500-win coaching club.  He also guided the Texters to their third-straight All-Filipino crown for the 2012–13 PBA season.

Meralco Bolts (2014–present)
In 2014, the teams under MVP group reshuffles its coaching staff. Black was assigned to be the coach for the Meralco Bolts, while Jong Uichico replaced him as head coach for Talk 'N Text. In his first conference with the Bolts in 2014–15 Philippine Cup, his team clinched the top six in the eliminations with a 6–5 win–loss record. They entered the quarterfinals as the sixth seed with twice-to-beat advantage over Purefoods and dethroned the defending champions in the process. Few days after, the Bolts lost to Alaska in the knockout round.

On the 2016 Governors' Cup Finals, Black returned to the championship series once again and led Meralco to their first finals appearance to face the Barangay Ginebra San Miguel led by another of the winningest coaches, Tim Cone, but lost to Barangay Ginebra in Game 6. The next Governors' Cup, he led the Bolts to its best finish in the eliminations with a 9 – 2 win – loss record for the 1st seed and a twice-to-beat advantage in the quarterfinals. Meralco then defeated the Blackwater Elite in two games and the Star Hotshots in the semifinals for three straight games and booked a finals rematch against Ginebra. However, the Bolts still lost the series in seven games.

Professional playing career statistics 

|-
| align="left" |  1979–80
| align="left" | Lancaster Red Roses
| CBA
| 17 || 27.7 || .568 || .000 || .734 || 9.9 || 1.7 || .9 || .5 || 22.5
|-
| align="left" |  1980
| align="left" | Detroit Pistons
| NBA
| 3 || 9.3 || .300 || .000 || .286 || .7 || .7 || .3 || .0 || 2.7
|-
| align="left" |  1980–81
| align="left" | Philadelphia Kings
| CBA
| 34 || 41.1 || .512 || .000 || .723 || 8.4 || 2.4 || 1.4 || .6 || 26.1
|-
| align="left" |  1981
| align="left" | Telfilin Polyesters
| PBA
| 14 || 46.0 || .577 || .000 || .709 || 24.6 || 3.1 || .3 || 2.2 || 51.8
|-
| align="left" |  1981–82
| align="left" | Lancaster Lightning
| CBA
| 29 || 36.8 || .483 || .000 || .606 || 7.8 || 1.9 || 1.2 || .6 || 20.4
|-
| align="left" |  1982
| align="left" | San Miguel Beer
| PBA
| 66 || 46.1 || .539 || .500 || .657 || 19.4 || 3.4 || .2 || 1.7 || 42.7
|-
| align="left" |  1983
| align="left" | Great Taste Coffee
| PBA
| 49 || 45.7 || .573 || .000 || .689 || 18.6 || 6.5 || .4 || 1.0 || 38.1
|-
| align="left" |  1985
| align="left" | Magnolia
| PBA
| 44 || 47.8 || .531 || .191 || .719 || 17.6 || 4.2 || .2 || 1.8 || 43.6
|-
| align="left" |  1986
| align="left" | Alaska Milk
| PBA
| 14 || 43.9 || .582 || .000 || .735 || 19.5 || 4.0 || .3 || 1.5 || 41.2
|-
| align="left" |  1987
| align="left" | Magnolia Ice Cream
| PBA
| 24 || 47.9 || .557 || .000 || .620 || 20.7 || 4.4 || .4 || 2.1 || 42.6
|-
| align="left" |  1988
| align="left" | San Miguel
| PBA
| 48 || 47.7 || .568 || .200 || .702 || 17.1 || 3.1 || .2 || 2.6 || 35.7
|-
| align="left" |  1990
| align="left" | San Miguel
| PBA
| 21 || 47.9 || .548 || .000 || .683 || 20.0 || 3.8 || .2 || 2.9 || 32.7
|-
|-class=sortbottom
| align="center" colspan=2 | Career
| All Leagues
| 363 || 44.2 || .547 || .178 || .685 || 16.5 || 3.7 || .5 || 1.6 || 36.3

Coaching record

Collegiate record

Personal life
Black is married to Benjie Davila. His son Aaron is also a basketball player with his team, the Meralco Bolts.

References

External links

Norman Black's PBA Coaching Highlights

1957 births
Living people
African-American basketball coaches
African-American basketball players
Alaska Aces (PBA) players
American expatriate basketball people in the Philippines
American men's basketball coaches
American men's basketball players
American television sports announcers
Basketball coaches from Maryland
Basketball players from Baltimore
Detroit Pistons players
Lancaster Red Roses (CBA) players
Philadelphia Kings players
Philippine Basketball Association All-Stars
Philippine Basketball Association broadcasters
San Miguel Beermen coaches
Philippine Basketball Association imports
Philippines men's national basketball team coaches
Player-coaches
Power forwards (basketball)
Saint Joseph's Hawks men's basketball players
San Miguel Beermen players
Shooting guards
Small forwards
Sports commentators
Undrafted National Basketball Association players
Pop Cola Panthers players
21st-century African-American sportspeople
20th-century African-American sportspeople
TNT Tropang Giga coaches
Pop Cola Panthers coaches
Sta. Lucia Realtors coaches
Ateneo Blue Eagles men's basketball coaches
Meralco Bolts coaches